Maggi or Margaret Weston may refer to:

 Lt MaggieWeston, a fictional character in Exofleet
 Maggie Weston (make-up artist), make-up artist, married to Terry Gilliam
 Maggi Weston, actress, seen in Regeneration (1915 film) and The Foundling (1915 film)
 Margaret Weston (1926–2021), Director of the Science Museum, London
 Margaret W. Weston, photography collection and gallery owner